Swindoe is the self-titled album by American rapper SwinDoe.  It is also his first studio album. It was released independently on February 8, 2010.

Reception

Critical Reception
iTunes album review stated Arizona rapper SwinDoe's self-titled effort is a sure and exciting debut suggesting that hip-hop's seldom heard cactus league deserves more time in the spotlight. Opening with a Game-like story of struggle ("God is a blacksmith/Look how he pounded me”) called "I Knew It," the album struts like a major-label release right from the start, gaining momentum with club tracks like the party-time "Blkberry 2.0" and tempering all the street fury with well-placed bedroom numbers such as the second-half highlight "Victim of Desire." The guest list might be unknown but it is talented, and the man at the center of it all is a versatile mix of Plies and Jay-Z with a unique Arizona twist. Check the moving closer "That's Why" for the best example of his insightful writing style.

Commercial Reception
It debuted on the Billboard Hot 100 at the number 123 position. It also debuted on the R&B/Hip-Hop Albums at #28, #2 on the Heatseekers Albums chart, Top Rap Albums at #10 and debuted at #14 on the Independent Albums chart.

Track listing

I Knew It Ft Laren 4:36
Blkberry 2.0 4:35
Candies 3:27
Up Ft Cameron 4:01
Body Talk Ft Andre McCray 4:47
La Verdad Ft Ricky Paz 3:41
Relapse Ft Ricky Paz 3:18
Shoes On Ft the Tu 4:10
Victim of Desire Ft Robard Johnson 4:27
Price Tag Ft Soul Fruit 3:53
Lattay Dattay 3:40
My World Ft the Tu 4:10
We Hustle Ft Baba O 3:42
It Wont Be Long Ft Awelle 3:49
Phony People Ft Ricky Paz  Swindoe 4:15
That's Why 5:09

Chart positions

References

2010 debut albums